Aleksandr Mikhailovich Katasonov (born 10 April 1972) is a Russian professional football coach and former player.

Career
In the 2005 Virslīga season he was voted as the best forward in the Virslīga. In the 2006 Virslīga season he played for Liepājas Metalurgs when they finished as runners-up in the league.

Honours
 Russian Second Division Zone Center top scorer: 1999 (26 goals).

Liepājas Metalurgs
Virsliga Champions (1):
 2005
 Virsliga Runners-up (3):
2003, 2004, 2006
 Latvian Cup Winners (1):
2006
 Virsliga Top Scorer (1):
2004

References

1972 births
Footballers from Moscow
Living people
Russian footballers
Association football forwards
FK Liepājas Metalurgs players
FC Lokomotiv Moscow players
FC Saturn Ramenskoye players
FC Amkar Perm players
Latvian Higher League players
Russian expatriate footballers
Expatriate footballers in Latvia
Russian expatriate sportspeople in Latvia
Russian football managers
Russian Premier League players
FC Znamya Truda Orekhovo-Zuyevo players